Robaire Fredrick Smith (born November 15, 1977) is a former American football defensive lineman that plays Defensive end and Defensive tackle.

High school and college career
Smith was a Parade All-America selection as a senior at Flint Northern High School. He earned first-team all-state honors with 92 tackles, 11 sacks and caught 17 passes for 297 yards and six touchdowns. He then attended Michigan State University and ranks fifth on the Spartans' career list with 22 sacks and fourth in tackles for loss with 48. He finished his college career with 191 tackles, three interceptions, four forced fumbles and three fumble recoveries.

NFL career
Smith was selected by the Tennessee Titans in the sixth round (197th overall) in the 2000 NFL Draft. In his rookie year, he played in eight games, recording six tackles, 2.5 sacks and one pass defensed. In 2001, he played in ten games, registering 16 tackles and two sacks. Smith signed with the Houston Texans in 2004 as an unrestricted free agent. He was cut on September 3, 2006, and re-signed with the Titans on September 6, 2006. He signed a contract as a free agent with the Cleveland Browns on March 16, 2007.

Personal life
Smith married his long-time girlfriend Monek on March 13, 2007, in Jamaica. The two have four children together, including a set of identical twin boys. His brother, Fernando Smith, played 7 seasons in the NFL.

References

External links
Cleveland Browns bio

1977 births
Living people
American football defensive ends
American football defensive tackles
Cleveland Browns players
Houston Texans players
Michigan State Spartans football players
Players of American football from Flint, Michigan
Tennessee Titans players